The 24th Canadian Parliament was in session from May 12, 1958, until April 19, 1962. The membership was set by the 1958 federal election on March 31, 1958, and it changed only somewhat due to resignations and by-elections until it was dissolved prior to the 1962 election.

It was controlled by a Progressive Conservative Party majority,  which won the largest majority in Canadian history, under Prime Minister John Diefenbaker and the 18th Canadian Ministry.  The Official Opposition was the Liberal Party, led by Lester B. Pearson.

The Speaker was Roland Michener.  See also List of Canadian electoral districts 1952-1966 for a list of the ridings in this parliament.

There were five sessions of the 24th Parliament.

List of members

Following is a full list of members of the twenty-fourth Parliament listed first by province or territory, then by electoral district.

Electoral districts denoted by an asterisk (*) indicates that district was represented by two members.

Alberta

British Columbia

Manitoba

New Brunswick

Newfoundland

Northwest Territories

Nova Scotia

Ontario

Prince Edward Island

Quebec

Saskatchewan

Yukon

Major Bills of the 24th Parliament
Important bills of the 24th parliament included:
The Canadian Bill of Rights

By-elections

References

Succession

Canadian parliaments
1958 establishments in Canada
1962 disestablishments in Canada
1958 in Canadian politics
1959 in Canadian politics
1960 in Canadian politics
1961 in Canadian politics
1962 in Canadian politics